The Challenge: Rivals III is the 28th season of the MTV reality game show, The Challenge. Being the third in the Rivals series, Rivals III marks the show's third trilogy (following the Inferno and Gauntlet series), continuing on from the original Rivals and Rivals II. It was filmed in Huatulco, Mexico and Mendoza, Argentina during November and December 2015, with former cast members from MTV's The Real World, The Challenge, and Are You the One? competing. This season marks the first since season 11 to not feature any original cast members from the Fresh Meat or Fresh Meat II seasons.

Unlike the previous two installments of the Rivals series, which featured same-gender pairs, Rivals III saw a change in format, with male/female pairs that had bitter feuds, fights, or strained relationships in previous seasons of Real World, The Challenge, and Are You the One? (similar to the Battle of the Exes series). Unlike the other Rivals seasons, only the winning team from each week's challenge was allowed to decide which team would face the last-place team in the elimination round. The season premiered with a special 90 minutes episode on May 4, 2016, and concluded its run on August 3, 2016, with the Reunion special. 

Lisa Fletcher replaced longtime Challenge producer Justin Booth as executive producer this season. Booth had served as the executive producer since season 15.

Contestants

Teams

Format
Each team participates in numerous challenges (sometimes called "missions"), which are followed by an elimination round — "The Jungle." The winning team of each challenge is safe from elimination, while the last-place finisher is automatically sent to The Jungle. The winning team also earns the right of choosing two teams that will face the last-place finisher in The Jungle. Prior to The Jungle, the two teams nominated by the winning team participate in an elimination draw in which all four participants either draw one of three white skulls or one black skull out of a bag (similar to the Free Agents season). If a participant draws a black skull, his/her team will face the last-place finisher in The Jungle.

Unlike the original Rivals and Rivals II seasons, both of which featured same-gender pairs, no money is awarded to a gender-specific first-place finisher after each mission, as this season features male/female pairs. At the end of the season, three teams will compete in the final challenge for a share of a $350,000 prize — the first-place team wins $275,000, second-place wins $50,000 and third-place wins $25,000. However, in episode 13, a twist revealed that one partner has a choice between keeping all the money to themselves, or sharing it with their partner.

Pre-season rivalry backgrounds
As with the first two Rivals seasons, Rivals III combines individuals who have had acrimonious or at least strained relations or interactions prior to the season. Unlike the first two Rivals seasons, which featured same-gender pairs, this season features male/female pairs. The following lists all the teams on Rivals III and explains why they've been paired and dubbed as "rivals." Each of the teams' history of animosity and/or open expressions of hostility are detailed as follows:

Bananas & Sarah: The two entered Battle of the Exes II with a long-running friendship, and an alliance that had lasted through many of their past seasons. During that season, however, Sarah played the game to win, and along with her partner Jordan Wiseley, fought to remove her toughest competition from the game whenever the opportunity presented itself, cunningly aligning herself with two power teams on opposing political sides, Bananas (and Nany) and Wes (and Theresa). After Bananas re-entered from "Ex-ile", they continued to work together (including Bananas' effort to then eliminate Wes) until Sarah nominated Bananas for the final Dome elimination, leaving Bananas stunned. Bananas and his partner Nany then lost in the Dome and were eliminated. 
Brandon & Briana: Briana disagreed with the way Brandon was playing the game during their appearance on Are You The One? 2, especially with Brandon's unwillingness to separate from Christina. Brandon then called out Briana for doing almost the same with her fling with Curtis Hadzicki. Ironically, Brandon and Briana are each other's perfect match. 
Cory & Ashley: The pair met as roommates during their original season of Real World: Ex-Plosion. They got along until Ashley got drunk and disrespected Cory by telling him she could buy his family. After that night, they continued to be on bad terms. After Ashley faced disagreements with many housemates, said she would only stay if the other roommates wanted her there. Cory was one of the four housemates to vote Ashley out, leading to her voluntary departure.
Dario & Nicole: The two got into a huge argument with a bunch of people on Battle of the Bloodlines where Dario tried voting Nicole's cousin Nany into The Pit.
Devin & Cheyenne: The two got into multiple fights on Are You The One? 3, as the result of Cheyenne taking exception to the way Devin treated women in the house (especially Kiki Cooper).
Jamie & KellyAnne: The two engaged in a very heated argument during Battle of the Bloodlines, after Anthony Cuomo, KellyAnne's cousin, purposely threw a challenge ("Too Clingy") in an unsuccessful attempt to save KellyAnne from The Pit. The challenge-throw attempt affected Jamie because if it were successful it could have led to Cara Maria Sorbello (Jamie's cousin) going into The Pit and thus possibly sending them home. The two are also rumored to have gotten into many other arguments.
Johnny & Jessica: Jessica never got along with Johnny and Averey Tressler during their original season on The Real World: Portland, as Jessica was called out for constantly needing attention by multiple housemates. Jessica also sided with Nia Moore during a tense night out between Nia and Averey. They got into multiple verbal fights where Johnny made denigrating remarks regarding Jessica's weight, calling her a "defect," and Jessica making fun of Johnny's small penis. This fight eventually made her cry and subsequently made her cry multiple times; and on an aftershow, Johnny disapproved of Jessica's refusal to condemn Nia's behavior in the house. Their rivalry continued on Free Agents, where Jessica voted for Johnny to go into the elimination round (which was cancelled due to Frank Sweeney's unexpected departure).
Leroy & Averey: Leroy & Nia Moore eliminated Averey & Johnny Reilly on Battle of the Exes II. On an episode of the aftershow, Leroy stated that he believed Johnny's side of the story regarding Johnny and Averey's breakup, mouthing off on-stage that she was a liar.
Nate & Christina: The two began to grow close on their season of Are You The One? 2, with both feeling that they could be a perfect match. However, when it was discovered that they were not, the ease with which Christina decided to go back to Brandon Tindel infuriated Nate, causing him to belittle her and claim her feelings for him were never real. Christina, in turn, started an actual relationship with Brandon.
Nelson & Amanda: During Are You The One? 3, Nelson was repulsed by Amanda's loud and obnoxious behavior. He also had taken the side of another housemate who had gotten aggressive with Amanda due to her behavior and refusal to leave the other person alone.
Thomas & Simone: The pair engaged in a verbal altercation during Battle of the Exes II, which featured Simone splashing drinks in Thomas' face. This fight had gone un-aired on the actual season, but was shown in the Battle of the Exes II trailer. The fight was revealed to be over Thomas not minding his business and Simone getting angry.
Tony & Camila: The two got into a verbal argument on Battle of the Bloodlines after Camila was informed by her sister, Larissa Nakagawa, that Tony called Larissa "short, weak, and that she would be the first person eliminated from the game." Tony defended himself by calling it lies, but later he confessed that he was being sarcastic. The fight escalated when Nicole Ramos stepped in the defense of the Nakagawa sisters, and Nany González came in the defense of her bloodline Nicole. The fight was stopped with Tony walking away and Camila crying because she didn't want her sister to be bullied by anyone.
Vince & Jenna: Jenna was annoyed by Vince during Battle of the Bloodlines. Vince (and his bloodline Bananas) also threw Jenna (and her bloodline Brianna Julig) into every elimination possible, and eventually, Jenna always came back and made it further in the game than Vince.
Wes & Nany: The two were on rival teams on Battle of the Exes II. Wes and Nany's partner, Johnny Bananas, battled for supremacy within the game. As a result, Wes and Theresa  sent Nany and Johnny "Bananas" Devenanzio into the Dome versus their friends and allies, Leroy Garrett and Nia Moore. Nany and Bananas were eliminated, but later re-entered the game via the "Battle of the Ex-iled" twist. Later in the game, Wes and Theresa were sent into an elimination against Leroy and Nia. During the "Hall Brawl" elimination, Wes was injured after being run into by Leroy, to which Nany laughed and taunted Wes as payback for their earlier animosity in the game.

Gameplay

Challenge games

 Give Me Some Slack: A platform is suspended 400 feet above the ocean. A series of five skulls is dangling from the platform. The girls are positioned outward at one plank, facing the dangling skulls, while their male partners are positioned on the other side of the platform, holding a rope that is attached to the backs of their female partners. The goal is for each girl to lean forward and retrieve as many skulls as possible, or in the fastest time, and deposit the skulls into their team bucket. Each successive skull becomes more difficult for each girl to reach, and a team is disqualified if the female partner falls off the plank. The team to retrieve the most skulls wins, while the last-place finisher is automatically sent to The Jungle.
 Winners: Vince & Jenna
 Dirty Laundry: Teams are positioned on a pole within a giant tub. The pole is coated with a bar of soap. Each team must use friction with their bodies (in a suggestive manner) in order to erode the soap and reveal four numbers on the wheel. Each team then runs toward a "clothesline" and a bucket full of T-shirts with numbers on them, and must dig through the bucket, then find the four T-shirts with the correct numbers, then hang the T-shirts on a clothesline.
 Winners: N/A (Nate & Christina,  Wes & Nany or Tony & Camila)
 Out On A Limb: A structure, with four platforms, is suspended 30 feet above the water. Each team must advance in unison from platform to platform by using a swinging bar, and ring the bell at the end of the last platform. Each successive platform becomes farther and more difficult for each team to reach. The team to advance the farthest or ring the bell in the fastest time wins, while the last-place team is automatically sent to The Jungle.
 Winners: Cory & Ashley
 Laps of Judgement: Just like a game of "Would You Rather...", teams have two options at five checkpoints. After each checkpoint is completed, each team grabs a token and runs up a hill and has to scale up a wall. After they put their token on their designated team rack, they have to race down the hill and repeat the process. The first team to obtain all five tokens wins the challenge.
 Round 1: Would You Rather... Eat Brains? or Eat Balls? Teams have to pick between eating cow brains or bull testicles.
 Round 2: Would You Rather... Reel It In? or Rock It Out? Teams must choose between lassoing and pulling in a 150 lb. drum, or tossing and landing five rocks on top of a drum.
 Round 3: Would You Rather... Be Sleepy? or Be Tired? Teams must choose between carrying a queen size mattress up the hill, or carrying five tires up the hill.
 Round 4: Would You Rather... Build a Bridge? or Build a House? Teams must choose between completing a bridge or a house out of tangram puzzle pieces.
 Round 5: Would You Rather... Eat a Birthday Cake? or Be in your Birthday Suit? Teams must choose between eating an entire birthday cake, or racing up the paved path naked.
 Winners: Bananas & Sarah
 Disqualified: Tony & Camila
 Road To Nowhere: A platform, with a runway, is suspended 400 feet above the ocean. Each team rides a cart toward the end of the runway, where a series of green, yellow and red flags are standing. Teammates try to collect as many flags as possible, before riding off the platform. Each flag is worth a series of points — 5 points for green, 10 points for yellow and 15 points for red; the latter two colored flags are more difficult for each team to retrieve. The team to collect the most points in the fastest time wins, while the last-place finisher is automatically sent to The Jungle.
 Winners: Nate & Christina
Disqualified: Jamie & KellyAnne
 Up All Night: Partners have to stand next to each other at the Jungle site on boxes overnight, and memorize certain details of the events that occur, which includes a mariachi band's performance, a taco truck and a man catching fire. Once an air horn sounds, each team is required to step down to a smaller box, making it more challenging because of the lack of sleep. No sitting or leaning is allowed, and the first team to have one player fall off or step off the boxes is automatically sent to the Jungle. When morning arrives, teams attempt to solve a puzzle based on the previous evening's events. The first team to correctly solve their puzzle is safe from elimination and wins $1,000 each. The winning team also selects two teams to go on a day trip with them and is safe from the Jungle.
 Winners: Bananas & Sarah
 Safe: Cory & Ashley and Vince & Jenna
 Take It to the Grave: Prior to this challenge, all of the girls were separated from their male partners, and secretly asked a series of questions regarding fellow contestants (similar to "Frenemies" from Rivals II), and were "buried alive" in the sand in coffins (similar to "I Dig You" from The Gauntlet III), which are labeled by their dates of birth. When all of their male partners arrive at the challenge, host T. J. Lavin asks the guys a series of trivia questions, and the goal for the guys is to match the answers of their female partners on a piece of cardboard. A correct answer allows a guy to move forward and closer to digging their female partner out from her grave. If the answer is wrong, that guy stays put. Once a guy has dug his female partner out from her grave, they race to ring a bell. The first team to ring the bell wins, while the last-place team is automatically sent to the Jungle.
 Winners: Dario & Nicole
Catch & Release: A pair of structures are suspended 30 feet above water. The girls are positioned at the top of one structure, while their male partners are positioned below them. The girls start swinging a bag attached to a rope, and have to gain enough momentum in order for their male partners to jump on the bags, and swing from one platform to another, where a series of yellow flags are hanging. The process continues for ten minutes, and the guy who grabs the most flags wins for their team, while the last-place team is automatically sent to the Jungle.
Winners: Bananas & Sarah
Bridging the Gap: Teams have to build a bridge by using planks with cutouts of various shapes. Before gaining access to the planks, each partner must complete a series of tasks — braiding/unbraiding a rope and completing 30 consecutive jumps using a jump rope — while having to move in unison and banded together in a poncho. After completing a task, there are three different sets of planks that are puzzle pieces in which teams have to determine where to place them on their designated bridge. The first team to complete their bridge wins, while the last-place team is automatically going into the Jungle.
Winners: Bananas & Sarah

Jungle games
 Back It Up: Teams have to shimmy their way up a wall while facing each other, transfer ceramic pottery on their laps, and deposit the pottery into a cargo net through a hole at the top of the wall. If a team drops a piece of pottery, they have to start over at ground level. The first team to deposit three pieces of pottery through their designated hole in the wall wins.
 Played by: Johnny & Jessica vs. Devin & Cheyenne
 Weight For Me: The guys use a pulley system connected to their female partner on the other side of a wall. The object is for the women to memorize a tile puzzle at the top of the wall and piece it together at the bottom of the wall. The first team to complete their puzzle wins.
 Played by: Nelson & Amanda vs. Johnny & Jessica
 Chill Out: Teams have to build a puzzle, featuring a series of wooden planks and discs, while moving back and forth from an ice tub. To start, each team sit in the tub for one minute, then try to stack their puzzle pieces until it reaches the height at their designated station. If the puzzle is not solved within two minutes, teams must return to their ice tub for another minute, the process continues until the first team to correctly solve their puzzle wins.
 Played by: Jamie & KellyAnne vs. Nelson & Amanda
 Hear Me Out: Teams engage in a soccer match within a large square, while blindfolded. Played in same-gender rounds and a best-of-three, each player is guided by their partners, who are standing outside of the arena. The first team to win two rounds wins. In the event of a tie after the first two rounds, a coin flip occur to determine which gender competes in the tiebreaker round.
 Played by: Wes & Nany vs. Jamie & KellyAnne
Spun Out: Players spin a turnstile attached to a rope, with their partners suspended above the ground. When one player spins the spool on ground level, the rope tightens, which makes it more difficult for their partner to hang on to their crossbar that is attached to a lifeline. The goal is for the player suspended above ground to hang on to their crossbar longer than their opponent. The team that win two rounds wins.
Played by: Nate & Christina vs. Cory & Ashley
Shattered Dreams: The girls crank a spool that is attached to a battering ram. Their male partners use a pair of ropes attached to the battering ram, and aim the battering ram to swing toward a series of nine windows on a wall. Teammates have to synchronize in order to use the proper height to shatter all nine windows. The first team to shatter all nine windows wins.
Played by: Wes & Nany vs. Nate & Christina
Tunnel Vision: Players from each team must crawl through a tunnel in the sand, then try to pass each other in the middle, then race to the opposite side to ring a bell to earn a point for their team. Played in same-gender heats, the first team to earn two points wins.
Played by: Dario & Nicole vs. Wes & Nany
Don't Whine for Me, Argentina: Teams have to transfer six wine barrels from a vineyard to a wine barrel rack. Each team has to correctly solve a riddle at their team podium prior to racing to the vineyard, and then haul the heavy wine barrels back to the racks. The first team to transfer all of their barrels to the racks wins.
Played by: Bananas & Sarah vs. Dario & Nicole

Final challenge
Prior to the final challenge, T. J. Lavin announced that not only would each team be competing against the other teams, but they would also have to compete against their fellow team members through a series of checkpoints. Each in-team victor would eventually be presented with an ultimate choice at the game's end: split the money with his/her partner, or take it all for himself/herself.

The first checkpoint involved untangling coiled wires. Sarah finished first and had to go back and help Bananas. Collectively, they finished the checkpoint first with Vince & Jenna coming in second, and Devin & Cheyenne coming in last. Vince & Jenna arrived at the second checkpoint first. The checkpoint was a giant memory game. Bananas finished first and got the point, and once again, Bananas & Sarah were the first team to complete the checkpoint. Vince & Jenna were second with Devin & Cheyenne once again in last. Checkpoint 3 was a two-dimensional, life-sized puzzle. Vince finished first but had to help Jenna finish, so Bananas & Sarah were actually the first team to finish the third checkpoint. Sarah finished before Bananas, so she got the point. Vince finished before Jenna. Cheyenne finished before Devin finally getting a point compared to Devin's two. Vince and Jenna edged out Bananas & Sarah on a subsequent run to finish out the first day. To end the day, each team member took turns staying up at night (Whichever team member stayed up the longest earned 2 points.). The second day consisted of eating gross foods to earn points, and then a climb up the rest of the mountain to the finish line. By the end of day two, Bananas & Sarah took first place (Bananas had more points), Vince & Jenna took second (Vince had more points), and Devin & Cheyenne finished in last (Devin had more points). The final checkpoint involved climbing a mountain, and whichever team arrived at the summit first was the winner of Rivals III.

 The Challenge: Rivals III winners: Bananas & Sarah (Bananas had the most points at the end and decided to keep all the money for himself.)
 Second place: Vince & Jenna (Vince had the most points at the end and decided to split the money with Jenna.)
 Third place: Devin & Cheyenne (Devin had the most points at the end and decided to split the money with Cheyenne.)

Game summary

Elimination chart

Jungle progress

Competition
 The team won the final challenge
 The team lost the final challenge
 The team won the challenge and was safe from the Jungle
 The team won their heat in the challenge but the final result was not revealed
 The team was not selected for the Jungle
 The team was selected for the Jungle, but pulled a white skull and was safe
 The team was selected for the Jungle, but did not have to compete
 The team won in the Jungle
 The team lost in the Jungle
 A contestant was removed from the competition due to medical reasons, so his/her partner was also eliminated
 A contestant withdrew from the competition, so his/her partner was also eliminated
 The team was disqualified from the competition due to disciplinary reasons

Episodes

Reunion special
The Reunion special aired on August 3, 2016, following the season finale and was hosted by Nessa. The cast members who attended the reunion were Bananas, Sarah, Vince, Jenna, Devin, Cheyenne, Dario, Nicole, Wes, Nany, Nate, Cory, Ashley, and Camila.

Notes

References

External links
 

Rivals III, The Challenge
Television shows set in Mexico
2016 American television seasons
Television shows filmed in Mexico
Television shows filmed in Argentina